A parade is a procession of people, usually organized along a street, often in costume, and often accompanied by marching bands, floats, or sometimes large balloons. Parades are held for a wide range of reasons, but are usually celebrations of some kind.

In British English, the term "parade" is usually reserved for either military parades or other occasions where participants march in formation; for celebratory occasions, the word procession is more usual. The term "parade" may also be used for multiple different subjects; for example, in the Canadian Armed Forces, "parade" is used both to describe the procession and in other informal connotations.

Protest demonstrations can also take the form of a parade, but such cases are usually referred to as a march instead.

Parade float

The parade float got its name because the first floats were decorated barges that were towed along the canals with ropes held by parade marchers on the shore. Floats were occasionally propelled from within by concealed oarsmen, but the practice was abandoned because of the high incidence of drowning when the lightweight and unstable frames capsized. Strikingly, among the first uses of grounded floats — towed by horses — was a ceremony in memory of recently drowned parade oarsmen.  Today, parade floats are traditionally pulled by motor vehicles or are powered themselves.

Parade grand marshals
Multiple grand marshals may often be designated for an iteration of the parade, and may or may not be in actual attendance due to circumstances (including death). A community grand marshal or other designations may be selected alongside a grand marshal to lead the front or other parts of the parade.

Aircraft and boats
Since the advent of such technology, it became possible for aircraft and boats to parade. A flypast is an aerial parade of anything from one to dozens of aircraft, both in commercial context at airshows and also to mark important dates, such as national days or significant anniversaries. They are particularly common in the United Kingdom, where they are often associated with Royal occasions. Similarly, for ships, there may be a sail-past of, e.g., tall ships (as was seen during Trafalgar 200) or other sailing vessels as during the celebrations of the 60th anniversary of World War II.

Longest parade
The longest parade in the world is the Hanover Schützenfest that takes place in Hanover every year during the Schützenfest.

Types of parades

Boat Parade (Winterfest) 
Carnival parade
Cavalcade
Circus
Electrical Parade
Flypast
Flower parade
Halloween parade
Military parade
Motorcade
Parade of horribles
Parade of Nations
Pride parade
Santa Claus parade
Technoparade
Ticker-tape parade
Victory parade
Walking day

Examples of annual event parades

Anheuser-Busch Washington's Birthday Parade, held annually in Laredo, Texas
Bastille Day Military Parade - Held annually in Paris, France, in celebration of the Bastille Day
Bud Billiken Parade and Picnic - Second largest annual parade in the United States, held on the second Saturday in August in Chicago, Illinois. 
Calgary Stampede Parade
Carnaval San Francisco
Carnival in the Netherlands
Dahlia parade in Zundert always held on the first Sunday in September
Days of '47 Parade in Salt Lake City
Disney Parks Christmas Day Parade
Dragon of Shandon Samhain parade in Cork, held annually on the 31st of October at night
Easter parade
Gasparilla Pirate Festival in Tampa is the third largest parade in the US and commemorates a pirate sack of the city.
Independence Day parade in Yerevan, Armenia
International Bank of Commerce "Under the Stars" youth parade, held annually in Laredo, Texas
Independence Day Parade parade in Kyiv, Ukraine.
Macy's Thanksgiving Day Parade
Mardi Gras
Main Street Electrical Parade 
Marksmen's Parade, Hannover
May Day Parade 
McDonald's Thanksgiving Parade, Chicago, Illinois
Independence Day Parade parade in Minsk, Belarus.
Mummers Parade
National Memorial Day Parade
New York's Village Halloween Parade
Nickelodeon Celebration Parade
Notting Hill Carnival
Orange Bowl Parade
Orange walk
Orlando Citrus Parade
Philippine Independence Day Parade
Procession of the Species
Republic Day Parade in India
Republic Day Parade in Pakistan
Rose Parade in United States
Saint Patrick's Day Parade Dublin, Munich, New York City, Boston, Holyoke, and San Diego
San Francisco Chinese New Year Festival and Parade
Singapore National Day Parade
Torchlight Parade, Seattle, Washington
Toronto Santa Claus Parade
Tournament of Roses Parade
Trooping the Colour
Independence Day Parade in Ashgabat, Turkmenistan
Victory Day Parade, held annually in the Russian Federation, formerly held in Ukraine, and celebrated in post-soviet nations. 
Vikingland Band Festival Parade Marching Championship
West Country Carnival
Zinneke Parade

Historical parades

To celebrate the federal government's victory in the American Civil War, 145,000 Union soldiers marched in a two-day Grand Review of the Armies in Washington, D.C.  They passed before the President, the Cabinet, and senior officers from May 23–24, 1865.

At the end of hostilities in Europe in 1944–45, "victory parades" were a common feature throughout the recently liberated territories. For example, on 3 September 1944, the personnel of the 2nd Canadian Infantry Division marched six abreast to the music of massed regimental pipe and drum bands through the streets of Dieppe, France, to commemorate the liberation of the city from German occupation, as well as commemorate the loss of over 900 soldiers from that formation during the Dieppe Raid two years earlier. On the Moscow Victory Parade of 1945 held in Moscow, Soviet Union in June 1945, the Red Army commemorated Victory in Europe with a parade and the ceremonial destruction of captured Wehrmacht and Waffen-SS standards.

Observances marked by parades

Anzac Day
Armed Forces Day
Canada Day
Caribana
Carnival
Chinese New Year
Christmas
Easter
Independence Day
International Firefighters' Day
Labor Day
Mardi Gras
Memorial Day
Navy Day
New Year's Day
Olympic Games (Summer, Winter, Summer Youth, Winter Youth and all Olympic-style sporting events and a few world championships), usually in the form of the Parade of Nations, where the teams or the flags of the participating teams enter one by one in alphabetical order of the host country
Police Day
Pioneer Day (Utah) – Days of '47 Parade
Puerto Rican Day Parade
Republic Day
Samhain
Schützenfest
Solstice
St. Patrick's Day
Thanksgiving
Vaisakhi
Victory Day

See also
Procession
Lord Mayor's Show

Notes

External links

Labor Day parade descriptions

The Recruits - Cordell Jigsaw production for Channel Ten featuring a NSW Police College Attestation Parade

 
Street culture
Walking